McGinniss is a surname. Notable people with the surname include:

Brother Michael McGinniss, a De La Salle Christian Brother and academic
Colin McGinniss, American member of punk rock band None More Black
Joe McGinniss, American writer (1942–2014)
Joe McGinniss Jr., American novelist (born 1970)
Will McGinniss, American member of the Christian rock band Audio Adrenaline